The 2017 Charleston Southern Buccaneers football team represented Charleston Southern University as a member of the Big South Conference during the 2017 NCAA Division I FCS football season. Led by first-year head coach Mark Tucker, the Buccaneers compiled an overall record of 6–5 with a mark of 3–2 in conference play, placing third in the Big South. Charleston Southern played home games at Buccaneer Field in Charleston, South Carolina.

Schedule

The game between Charleston Southern and South Carolina State had been rescheduled in advance of the arrival of Hurricane Irma, but on September 7, both schools agreed to postpone the game later in the season and the game was ultimately cancelled. The game was replaced with a match-up vs. Indiana on October 7.

Game summaries

at Mississippi State

at Elon

Point

Mississippi Valley State

at Indiana

at Presbyterian

Savannah State

Monmouth

at Gardner–Webb

at Kennesaw State

Liberty

Ranking movements

References

Charleston Southern
Charleston Southern Buccaneers football seasons
Charleston Southern Buccaneers football